Hébertville-Station is a village municipality in Lac-Saint-Jean-Est Regional County Municipality in the Saguenay–Lac-Saint-Jean region of Quebec.

Demographics 

See also
 List of village municipalities in Quebec

References

Villages in Quebec
Incorporated places in Saguenay–Lac-Saint-Jean